Værløse Station is a station on the Farum radial of the S-train network in Copenhagen, Denmark. It serves the town of Værløse in Furesø municipality.

References

External links

S-train (Copenhagen) stations
Railway stations opened in 1906
1906 establishments in Denmark
Railway stations in Denmark opened in the 20th century